PRIMOS is a discontinued operating system developed during the 1970s by Prime Computer for its minicomputer systems. It rapidly gained popularity and by the mid-1980s was a serious contender as a mainline minicomputer operating system. 

With the advent of PCs and the decline of the minicomputer industry, Prime was forced out of the market in the early 1990s, and by the end of 2010 the trademarks for both PRIME and PRIMOS no longer existed.

Prime had also offered a customizable real-time OS called RTOS.

Internals
One feature of PRIMOS was that it, like UNIX, was largely written in a high level language (with callable assembly language library functions available). At first, this language was FORTRAN IV, which was an odd choice from a pure computer science standpoint: no pointers, no if-then-else, no native string type, etc. FORTRAN was, however, the language most known to engineers, and engineers were a big market for Prime in their early years. 

The unusual choice of FORTRAN for the OS programming language had to do with the people who founded Prime. They had worked for Honeywell on a NASA project. FORTRAN was the language they had used both at NASA and, for many of them, at MIT. 

Honeywell,  at that time, was uninterested in minicomputers, so they left and founded Prime, "taking" the code with them. They developed hardware optimized to run FORTRAN, including machine instructions that directly implemented FORTRAN's distinctive 3-way branch operation.

Since Prime's hardware did not perform byte addressing, there was no impetus to create a C compiler. Late models of the hardware were eventually modified to support I-mode, and programs compiled in C.

Later, around version 18, a version of PL/1, called PL/P, became the high level language of choice within PRIMOS, and 
the PL/P and Modula-2 languages were used in the Kernel. Furthermore, some new PRIMOS utilities were written in SP/L, which was similar to PL/P.

The source code to PRIMOS was available to customers and, thanks to FORTRAN and PL/P, customers could reasonably modify PRIMOS as needed. For example, around 1990, the University of Salford in the UK, modified the PRIMOS running on its five 9955 systems so that undergraduates could no longer use the MESSAGE command, that wrapped the PRIMOS SMSG$() call, to send messages to other undergraduates, because online "chatting" using that command was becoming rife, tying up terminals from the limited pool available. Messaging using that command was akin to SMS text messaging today, except a maximum of 80 characters could be sent per message.

Very early versions of PRIMOS (revision 6) were originally called DOS (PRIMOS 2) and later DOSVM (PRIMOS 3), but starting with PRIMOS 4, on the P400 system, PRIMOS was the name that stuck. There were many major releases of PRIMOS. The last official revision (24.0.0.R52) was released July 3, 1997. By this time, a company called Peritus (which employed a number of ex-Prime engineers) was maintaining PRIMOS.

From Revision 19, major portions of PRIMOS were written in the languages SPL and Modula-2, the usage of the Prime Macro Assembler _(PMA), FORTRAN IV and PL/P declined considerably around this time. Programs were guaranteed to run on all current Prime processors (subject to sufficient resources being available), as well as all subsequent Prime processors.

In the versions of PRIMOS ca. 1977 and later, the filesystem included a distinctive construct known as the Segment Directory. Unlike more traditional directories, the files anchored in a segment directory were located using an integer index, effectively reducing searches of the directory to a simple hash function. Segment Directories were used in their Keyed-Index/Direct Access (KI/DA) file access system and in later versions of the system loader.

Data access
Indexed data could be stored in a MIDAS file: Multi-Indexed Data Access System and be accessed via COBOL or FORTRAN. Among the
third party tools was a package named Queo, which was more powerful than COBOL despite being less verbose.

The PRIMOS character set was basically ASCII but with the 8th bit inverted. The original 7-bit standard for ASCII left the 8th bit unspecified, but on the commonly available Teletype Model 33 ASR, the bit was customarily set to 1, and this became Prime's standard. This is vital to realize when transferring data from PRIMOS to almost any other system.

User tools
By the time of Prime Computer's demise, a list of languages supported by Primos included:

Also available, but relatively uncommon, were:
 DBASIC Interpreted BASIC with double-precision arithmetic
 RPG Compiles an RPG II program (non-virtual)
 SPL Compiles an SPL program
 VRPG Compiles an RPG II program (virtual)

Scripting
Late versions of PRIMOS included a scripting language, CPL (Command Processing Language) that ESRI used as a basis for its platform-independent scripting languages AML (for ArcInfo) and SML (PC-ARC/INFO).

This was a step beyond what already was available via:
 COMI Command input (.COMI filetype)
 COMO Command output similar to a batch log file, but also usable interactively

PHANTOMS vs JOBS
"Phantoms" were a form of unattended background processes that immediately began to run in the background when initiated by the PHANTOM command. "Conventional" batch jobs were initiated via the JOB command, including the ability to schedule them for a particular time.

Networking
Primes's main offerings, each covering a specific need, were:
 PRIMENET
 RINGNET
 RJE

PRIMENET
Prime's PRIMENET software was designed to enable "transparent access to any system in the network without burdening the user with extra commands."  With PRIMENET, a user on System A could access files on System B as if they were on System A, or even log into another system using the RLOGIN (Remote Login) command.

RINGNET
Released similar timing to PRIMENET,
 it enabled high-speed Local Area Networking.

RJE
2780/3790 emulation was included.

Primix
In 1985, Prime's port of AT&T's UNIX System V, called Primix, became available with Primos Release 19.4.2 that was modified to include Unix functions. It co-existed with PRIMOS, allowing users to switch back and forth.

See also
 List of operating systems
 Timeline of operating systems

References

External links
Sourcecode Rev 19
Usenet post of Jim Wilcoxson about the Prime 50-series emulator he created, running PRIMOS 19.2 (7 April 2007)
Prime Computer FAQ from comp.sys.prime Usenet group
Documentation
Software

Proprietary operating systems
Discontinued operating systems
Multics-like
1972 software